Mantidactylus aerumnalis is a species of frog in the family Mantellidae.
It is endemic to Madagascar.
Its natural habitats are subtropical or tropical moist lowland forests, subtropical or tropical moist montane forests, and rivers.
It is threatened by habitat loss.

References

aerumnalis
Endemic frogs of Madagascar
Taxa named by Mario Giacinto Peracca
Amphibians described in 1893
Taxonomy articles created by Polbot